Navagam Kalavad is a village in Kalavad tehsil of Jamnagar district of Gujarat state of India. The 2011 Census of India counted 2,272 local inhabitants.

See also 
 Kalavad
 Jamnagar district

References 

Villages in Jamnagar district